Taragoola is a rural locality in the Gladstone Region, Queensland, Australia. In the  Taragoola had a population of 0 people.

History
Taragoola State School opened circa 1919 and closed circa 1934.

In the  Taragoola had a population of 0 people.

Geography
Lake Awoonga forms the eastern boundary.

Road infrastructure
The Gladstone–Monto Road runs along the south-western boundary.

References 

Gladstone Region
Localities in Queensland